The Committee on Ways and Means is the chief tax-writing committee of the United States House of Representatives. The committee has jurisdiction over all taxation, tariffs, and other revenue-raising measures, as well as a number of other programs including Social Security, unemployment benefits, Medicare, the enforcement of child support laws, Temporary Assistance for Needy Families, foster care, and adoption programs. Members of the Ways and Means Committee are not allowed to serve on any other House Committee unless they are granted a waiver from their party's congressional leadership. It has long been regarded as the most prestigious committee of the House of Representatives.

The United States Constitution requires that all bills regarding taxation must originate in the U.S. House of Representatives, and House rules dictate that all bills regarding taxation must pass through Ways and Means.  This system imparts upon the committee and its members a significant degree of influence over other representatives, committees, and public policy. Its Senate counterpart is the U.S. Senate Committee on Finance.

Recent chairmen have included Bill Thomas, Charlie Rangel, Sander Levin, Dave Camp, Paul Ryan, Kevin Brady, and Richard Neal. On January 9, 2023, Jason T. Smith was sworn in as the new chairman of the Committee on Ways and Means, upon the commencement of the 118th Congress.

History

The Ways and Means Committee was first established during the first Congress, in 1789. However, this initial version was disbanded after only 8 weeks; for the next several years, only ad hoc committees were formed, to write up laws on notions already debated in the whole House. It was first established as a standing committee by resolution adopted December 21, 1795, and first appeared among the list of regular standing committees on January 7, 1802. Upon its original creation, it held power over both taxes and spending, until the spending power was given to the new Appropriations Committee in 1865.

During the Civil War the key policy-maker in Congress was Thaddeus Stevens, as chairman of the committee and Republican floor leader. He took charge of major legislation that funded the war effort and permanently transformed the nation's economic policies regarding tariffs, bonds, income and excise taxes, national banks, suppression of money issued by state banks, greenback currency, and western railroad land grants. Stevens was one of the major policymakers regarding Reconstruction, and obtained a House vote of impeachment against President Andrew Johnson (who was acquitted by the Senate in 1868). Hans L. Trefousse, his leading biographer, concludes that Stevens "was one of the most influential representatives ever to serve in Congress. [He dominated] the House with his wit, knowledge of parliamentary law, and sheer willpower, even though he was often unable to prevail."  Historiographical views of Stevens have dramatically shifted over the years, from the early 20th-century view of Stevens and the Radical Republicans as tools of enormous business  and motivated by hatred of the white South, to the perspective of the neoabolitionists of the 1950s and afterwards, who applauded their efforts to give equal rights to the freed slaves.

Three future presidents – James Polk, Millard Fillmore, and William McKinley – served as Committee Chairman.  Before the official roles of floor leader came about in the late 19th century, the Chairman of Ways and Means was considered the Majority Leader.  The chairman is one of very few Representatives to have office space within the Capitol building itself.

Political significance

Because of its wide jurisdiction, Ways and Means has always been one of the most important committees with respect to impact on policy. Although it lacks the prospects for reelection help that comes with the Appropriations Committee, it is seen as a valuable post for two reasons: given the wide array of interests that are affected by the committee, a seat makes it easy to collect campaign contributions and since its range is broad, members with a wide array of policy concerns often seek positions to be able to influence policy decisions. Some recent major issues that have gone through the Ways and Means Committee include welfare reform, a Medicare prescription drug benefit, Social Security reform, George W. Bush's tax cuts, and trade agreements including the North American Free Trade Agreement (NAFTA) and the Central America Free Trade Agreement (CAFTA).

From 1911 to 1974, the Ways and Means Committee also had the responsibility to appoint members of other committees  in addition to  its legislative duties. When Ways and Means chair Wilbur Mills' career ended in scandal, Congressman Phillip Burton transferred the committee's selection powers to a separate, newly created committee.

Members, 118th Congress

Resolutions electing members:  (Chair),  (Ranking Member),  (R),  (D)

Subcommittees
There are six subcommittees in the 118th Congress. In 2011, the Subcommittee on Income Security and Family Support was renamed the Subcommittee on Human Resources, returning to the name it held prior to the 110th United States Congress. In 2015, the Select Revenue Measures was renamed the Subcommittee on Tax Policy. In 2019 these two subcommittees were again renamed under Democratic control; Human Resources became Worker and Family Support and Tax Policy was renamed to Select Revenue Measures. In 2023 and under a return to Republican control, they were again renamed to Work and Welfare and Tax respectively.

List of chairs

Historical membership rosters

117th Congress

Resolutions electing members:  (Chair),  (Ranking Member),  (D),  (R),  (R),  (R)
Subcommittees

116th Congress

Resolutions electing members:  (Chair);  (Ranking Member),  (D),  (R)

Subcommittee

115th Congress

See also

 List of current United States House of Representatives committees

References

Sources
 H. Doc. 100-244, The Committee on Ways and Means a Bicentennial History 1789-1989

Further reading

 Cataldo, Everett Felix. "The House Committee on Ways and Means" (PhD dissertation, The Ohio State University, 1965) online.

 Curtis, Thomas B. "The House Committee on Ways and Means: Congress Seen Through a Key Committee." Wisconsin Law Review(1966): 121+ online.

 Davidson, Roger. Masters of the House: Congressional leadership over two centuries (Routledge, 2018)

 Kennon, Donald R., and Rebecca Mary Rogers. The Committee on Ways and Means: A Bicentennial History 1789-1989  (US Government Printing Office, 1989).

 Manley, John F. "The House Committee on Ways and Means: Conflict management in a congressional committee." American Political Science Review  59.4 (1965): 927-939.
 Manley, John F. The politics of finance: the House Committee on Ways and Means ( Little, Brown, 1970).

 Sullivan, Terry. "Voter's paradox and logrolling: An initial framework for committee behavior on appropriations and ways and means." Public Choice (1976): 31-44. online

 Winfree, Paul. A History (and Future) of the Budget Process in the United States (Springer Nature, 2019).

Primary  sources
Rangel, Charles B.; Wynter, Leon (2007). And I Haven't Had a Bad Day Since: From the Streets of Harlem to the Halls of Congress. New York: St. Martin's Press.

External links

  (Archive)
 House Ways and Means Committee. Legislation activity and reports, Congress.gov.
 House Ways and Means Committee Hearings and Meetings Video. Congress.gov.

Ways and Means
1789 establishments in the United States
United States federal taxation legislation